The 1997 Heineken Cup Final was the final match of the 1996–97 Heineken Cup, the second season of Europe's top club rugby union competition. The match was played on 25 January 1997 at the Arms Park in Cardiff. The match was contested by Brive of France and Leicester of England. Brive won the match 28–9; they took the lead early on through a fourth-minute penalty from Christophe Lamaison, and Sébastien Viars extended that lead with an unconverted try two minutes later. Leicester responded with three penalties from John Liley, but Brive finally made their pressure show with three second-half tries, one of which was converted, before Lamaison added a drop goal to seal a 19-point victory.

Match details

See also
1996–97 Heineken Cup

References

Final
1997
Heineken Cup Final 1997
Heineken Cup Final
Heineken Cup Final
Heineken Cup Final
1990s in Cardiff
CA Brive matches
Leicester Tigers matches